In statistics, the concept of the shape of a probability distribution arises in questions of finding an appropriate distribution to use to model the statistical properties of a population, given a sample from that population. The shape of a distribution may be considered either descriptively, using terms such as "J-shaped", or numerically, using quantitative measures such as skewness and kurtosis.

Considerations of the shape of a distribution arise in statistical data analysis, where simple quantitative descriptive statistics and plotting techniques such as histograms can lead on to the selection of a particular family of distributions for modelling purposes.

Descriptions of shape

The shape of a distribution will fall somewhere in a continuum where a flat distribution  might be considered central and where types of departure from this include: mounded (or unimodal), U-shaped, J-shaped, reverse-J shaped and multi-modal. A bimodal distribution would have two high points rather than one. The shape of a distribution is sometimes characterised by the behaviours of the tails (as in a long or short tail). For example, a flat distribution can be said either to have no tails, or to have short tails. A normal distribution is usually regarded as having short tails, while an exponential distribution has exponential tails and a Pareto distribution has long tails.

See also
Shape parameter
List of probability distributions

Notes

References
Yule, G.U., Kendall, M.G. (1950) An Introduction to the Theory of Statistics, 14th Edition (5th Impression, 1968), Griffin, London. 
den Dekker A. J., Sijbers J., (2014) "Data distributions in magnetic resonance images: a review", Physica Medica

Theory of probability distributions